Begovac (known as Begovac Plaščanski until 1991) is a village in the Lika region of Croatia, in the municipality of Saborsko, Karlovac County.

History

Culture

Demographics
According to the 2011 census, the village of Begovac has 16 inhabitants. This represents 9.20% of its pre-war population according to the 1991 census.

The 1991 census  recorded that 99.43% of the village population were ethnic Serbs (173/174) and 0.57% were of other ethnic origin (1/174).

NOTE: Known as Begovac Plaščanski until 1991 census, and Begovac from 2001 census on

Sights
 Blaćansko lake

Notable natives and residents

See also 
 Saborsko massacre

References

Populated places in Karlovac County
Serb communities in Croatia